"Out of My Hands" is a song by Christian rock act Jars of Clay that appears on their 2010-released album, The Shelter. The song, which was the first radio single released in support of the album, features vocal contributions from Mike Donehey of Tenth Avenue North and Leigh Nash of Sixpence None the Richer. The single peaked at No. 27 on Billboards Christian Songs chart on September 25, 2010. "Out of My Hands" was co-written by two members of the band's touring ensemble, Gabe Ruschival and Jeremy Lutito.

Track listing
"Out of My Hands" – 4:13 (Dan Haseltine, Stephen Mason, Matt Odmark, Gabe Ruschival, Jeremy Lutito)

Charts
 No. 27, Billboard Christian Songs

Personnel 
Performance''
 Dan Haseltine – vocals
 Charlie Lowell – piano, organ
 Stephen Mason – guitars
 Matt Odmark – guitars
 Mike Donehey – vocals
 Leigh Nash – background vocals
 Gabe Ruschival – bass
 Jeremy Lutito – drumsTechnical'''
 Jars of Clay – producer
 Mitch Dane – engineering
 Joshua Niles – engineering assistant
 Jay Ruston – mixing
 Stephen Marsh – mastering

References

2010 singles
Jars of Clay songs
Songs written by Dan Haseltine
Songs written by Stephen Mason (musician)
Songs written by Matt Odmark
2010 songs